USS Yucca has been the name of three ships in the United States Navy:

 The first  was a wooden hulled steamer, built near the end of the American Civil War and in commission from 1865 to 1868.
 USS Yucca (AT-32), a tugboat, was renamed  before her keel was laid in 1919.
 The second , formerly named SS Utacarbon, was a tanker in commission from 1945 to 1946.

United States Navy ship names